The Zeyzoun Dam is a failed embankment dam near Zayzun, Hama Governorate, Syria. It impounded water pumped from the nearby Orontes River. The dam's reservoir was filled in the winter and expended its water during the summer.

The dam failed on 4 June 2002, killing 27 people, displacing 2,000 and directly affecting over 10,000. Hours before the dam failed, in the afternoon, cracks were noticed in the embankment. People were evacuated as water began to pour through the cracks. The water engulfed , destroying 251 homes and damaging hundreds of others. Several International organizations, non-government organizations and nations sent aid. Reportedly, Syrian officials had ignored warnings that the dam was in need of serious repair.

See also
Dam failure

References

2002 disasters in Syria
Dams in Syria
Dam failures in Asia
2002 industrial disasters
Dams completed in 1996
Buildings and structures in Hama Governorate
Al-Ghab Plain
2002 in Syria